Tiramisu is a 2008 Dutch drama film directed by Paula van der Oest.

Plot
When actress Anne (Anneke Blok) finds out that her financial affairs are in a mess she realizes that she has to sell her houseboat.

Cast 
 Anneke Blok as Anne
 Jacob Derwig as Jacob
 Gijs Scholten van Aschat as Lex
 Sylvia Hoeks as Vanessa 
 Olga Zuiderhoek as Nettie
  as Bert
 Laura de Boer as Luna

References

External links 

2008 drama films
2008 films
2000s Dutch-language films
Dutch drama films